Jaćmierz  (Yachmyr) is a village in the administrative district of Gmina Zarszyn, within Sanok County, Subcarpathian Voivodeship, in south-eastern Poland.

The village has an approximate population of 830.

See also
 Walddeutsche

References

Villages in Sanok County
Ruthenian Voivodeship
Kingdom of Galicia and Lodomeria
Lwów Voivodeship